Kolapodi is a type of flour, made out of soapstone powder, rice flour mixed with limestone powder,a type of red soil ( called as kaavi ,not brick powder because brick powder is considered inauspicious,and used only in funeral ceremony(karumathi)to draw kolam by priest to call dead soul and they rub the pattern completely after the ceremony is over and in black magic practices to attract dead souls and not in auspicious occasions, 
 homes and temples)and finely ground white stone powder. It is used to create floor art in India called kolam. It can be used to make beautiful patterns in front of the house gate, in front of temples and in Pooja room.
Usually woman folk  clean the entrance with broom ,sprinkle water then draw kolams at dawn and dusk time( twice a day).
Colored kolapodi is made by mixing limestone powder with colours. Margazhi is a month for colour kolams. Many people in South India draw kolam with colour kola powder. Kolapodi traders who sell kolapodi and colour kolapodi are the most sought during the Margazhi month of Tamil Calendar and Pongal or Sankaranthi festival. Usually these traders will have 18 different colour kolapodis. Kolapodi makes it easier for women to apply kolam and also makes the kolam look brighter and well finished.Red soil powder also known as "Kaavi" is applied as an outline for kolams especially on special occasions and pooja days.

History 
Kolapodi is used to make kolams that are a symbol of auspiciousness. It is a Hindu belief that the geometrical patterns and designs applied with kolapodi at the entrance of a home, invites Goddess Lakshmi into the household and drives away the evil spirits. It is mostly a South Indian tradition practised widely in Tamil Nadu.

Every morning millions of women across South India do a ceremonial act that dates back to several centuries - they will tidy their front yards and decorate the ground at the entry with an intricate design formed out of rice powder or kolapodi. The procedure starts with a powerful sweeping of the front area of the house/steps and slopes followed by an equally robust splashing of water onto the patch that will characteristic of the day. As the water runs off, the method of creation of kolam starts with a few dabs of kolapodi or rice flour. They lay down the kolapodi or white powder aesthetically and the lines are not too thick or too thin. The outcome is a work of art and it changes from day to day.

References

Indian sandpainting